Cristian Bădiliță (born March 27, 1968) is a theologian, essayist, translator and contemporary Romanian poet.

Biography
He was born in Săveni, Botoșani County, where he lived until the age of 14. He settled afterwards in Botoșani, where he studied at the A. T. Laurian High School. His debut was in 1982 when he published his first poems in Athenaeum magazine. In 1986 he had a second literary debut, again with poetry, in Chronicle, an important cultural magazine in Iași. In 1990 he transferred to the Classical Languages department, where he met the scholar Petru Creția. Their friendship resulted in an essay on the Book of Revelation of John. 

In 1991–1992 Bădiliță studied theology at the Seminario Conciliar in Madrid. At the Seminar he studied with professors such as the patrologist Juan Ayan Calvo and the specialist in the  phenomenology of religion, . He taught ancient Greek language and literature at West University of Timișoara, before he settled in France in 1995, together with his wife, Smaranda Bădiliță, a specialist in Philon of Alexandria. He holds a Ph.D. in ancient history of Christianity from the University Paris IV Sorbonne, with thesis "Les métamorphoses de l'Antichrist chez les Pères de l'Eglise", Distinction summa cum laude. The jury included Monique Alexandre, Jean-Noël Guinot, Jean-Claude Fredouille, and Olivier Munnich. The work was awarded the "Salomon Reinach" Prize of the Hellenistic Association of France. 

Bădiliță specialized in Greek and Latin patristic literature. In 2001, he started to collaborate with New Europe College in Bucharest, by organizing an international conferences on John Cassian and another on the fathers of the church in the 20th century. He organized the third international conference on patristic and ecumenism at Ovidius University of Constanța. Also within the  New Europe College from 2003 to 2011 he has been coordinating together with Francisca Băltăceanu and Monica Broșteanu the commented translation of the Septuagint, a project published in collaboration with the Polirom Publishing House and the "Anonymous Foundation". He coordinated the first scientific edition of the writings of Nicolae Steinhardt, published by Humanitas. He is currently working on a commented translation of the New Testament. 

He considers himself a Christian right-wing anarchist and advocates for the restoration of monarchy in Romania. He is a critic of the communist and neo-communist imposture, often expressing his reservations against the modern ochlocratic system in Romania. He actively participated in the Romanian Revolution of December 1989 and the organization of Golaniad protests at University Square, Bucharest (1990). He was fellow of the Institute of Culture in Trento and Wissenschaftkolleg in Berlin. He participated in numerous international conferences, as well as in writing collective volumes, magazines and international dictionaries. On 22 December 2009 he launched the cultural religious electronic magazine "Oglindanet".

Works

Publications

 Finger on the Wound and other Antipolitical Disintoxications (Vremea, 2011)
 Guide of Antichristology. Studies, translations and commentaries (Second Edition, Vremea, 2011)
 Landscape with Ape and Angel. Apocryphal letters of Archibald's de la Cruz (Limes, 2011)
 Patristique et oecuménisme. Themes, contextes, personnages (Beauchesne, 2010)
 Seraphita- Concerto for harp and guillotine (Gutenberg Galaxy, 2010)
 Small Book of Heresies (Gutenberg Galaxy, 2010)
 Asceticism and Childhood - Visible and Invisible Things of the Ascetic Childhood (Editura Curtea Veche, 2010)
 Kordian Gnot (sic!) (Galaxia Gutenberg, 2009)
 Seraphita- Concerto for harp and guillotine (Curtea Veche, 2009)
 Orthodoxy versus Orthodoxy (Curtea Veche, 2009)
 Science, Love, Faith - Conversations with European Patrologists (Curtea Veche, 2008)
 Glaphyra. Nine Biblical and Patristic studies (Polirom, 2008)
 God of Mancha sleeping with his cracked temple on my shoulder (Curtea Veche, 2008)
 Sacred and Melancholy (ed. II, Dacia, 2007)
 Platonopolis or Reconciliation with Philosophy (ed. II, Curtea Veche, 2007)
 The Loneliness of a Migratory Bird (Curtea Veche, 2007)
 Poems for Birds and Aliens (Curtea Veche, 2007)
 Metamorphoses of Antichrist in the Church Fathers’, translated by Teodora Ioniță (Polirom, 2006)
 Les Pères de l'Église d'aujourd'hui dans le monde (with Charles Kannengiesser, Beauchesne, 2006)
 Temptation of Misanthropy. Stromateis (Edition II, Curtea Veche, 2006)
 King with Harp in Hand (ed. II, Old Court, 2006)
 Finger on the Wound (Curtea Veche, 2006)
 Les métamorphoses de l'Antichrist chez les Peres de l'Eglise (Beauchesne, 2005)
 MicroRevelation (Curtea Veche, 2005)
 Arcimboldo's Sunday (Brumar, 2004)
 Gordian Knot (ed III, Curtea Veche, 2004)
 Visible and Invisible Things (Curtea Veche, 2004)
 Jean Cassien entre l'Orient et l'Occident (with Attila Jakab, Beauchesne, 2003)
 Mircea Eliade. Encounter with the Sacred (ed. II, Echinox, 2001)
 Death and the Monk (Polirom, 1998)
 Myths of Plato (Humanitas, 1996)

Editions and anthologies
 Les Pères de l'Église d'aujourd'hui dans le monde (Paris, 2006); in collaboration with Charles Kannengiesser
 St. Gregory of Nyssa – Life of St. Macrina (Anastasia, 2004);
 Jean Cassien entre l'Orient et l'Occident (Ed. Beauchesne / Polirom, 2003); in collaboration with Attila Jakab
 Europe's Nostalgia. Volume in honor of Al. Paleologu (Polirom, 2003); in collaboration with Tudorel Urian
 About Absolute Love. Commentary on the First Epistle of John (Polirom, 2003)
 Mircea Eliade. Encounter with the sacred (Edition II, Equinox, 2001)
 Socrates, the Man (Humanitas, 1996)
 Myths of Plato (Humanitas, 1996)

Commented Translations from Greek and Latin
 New Testament – Gospel of John, bilingual edition, Volume II (Editura Curtea Veche, 2010)
 New Testament – Matthew, bilingual edition, Volume I (Curtea Veche, 2009)
 Three Mystical Novels of Antiquity - Joseph and Aseneth, Testament of Job, Testament of Abraham (Second Edition Revised, Curtea Veche, 2008)
 Apocryphal Gospels (ed. IV, Polirom, 2007)
 Patericon (ed. III, Polirom, 2007)
 Evagrius of Pontus, practical Treaty. Gnostic (second edition, Polirom, 2003)
 Three of the Old Testament Apocrypha (Polirom, 2000)
 Apocalypse of Paul (Polirom, 1999); in collaboration with Smaranda Bădiliță

References

External links
  
   A cultural religious electronic magazine.
  

1968 births
Living people
People from Săveni
Members of the Romanian Orthodox Church
University of Bucharest alumni
Paris-Sorbonne University alumni
Romanian writers
Romanian theologians
Eastern Orthodox theologians
Romanian expatriates in France
Translators of the Bible into Romanian